Fyodor Vasilyevich Konstantinov (21 February 1901 – 8 December 1991) was a Soviet Marxist–Leninist philosopher and academician.

Career

Born in to a peasant family, he joined the Red Army after the October Revolution and became a participant of the Civil War in Siberia.  

After becoming a member of the Communist Party in 1918, he graduated from the Institute of Red Professors in 1932 and earned his PhD in Philosophy in 1935. 

During his career he served as an academic secretary of the Institute of Philosophy of the Communist Academy, Professor of Propaganda of the Central Committee, and deputy director of the Institute of Philosophy of the Academy of Sciences of the Soviet Union. He was editor-in-chief of Problems of Philosophy (1952–54) and Коммунист (Communist, 1958–62). He also acted as head of the Propaganda Department of the CC of the CPSU (Отделом пропаганды и агитации ЦК КПСС, 1955–58). He was a main author of the historical materialism (Историч материализм, 1951) and the Fundamentals of Marxist Philosophy (Основы марксистской философии, 1958), and chief editor of the Philosophical Encyclopedia (volumes 1–3, 1960–64). 

He served as director of the Institute of Philosophy of the Academy of Sciences of the Soviet Union (1962–67). He was the founder and president of the Philosophical Society of the USSR (Философского общества СССР, 1971).

References

1901 births
1991 deaths
20th-century Russian philosophers
People from Arzamassky Uyezd
Central Committee of the Communist Party of the Soviet Union candidate members
Full Members of the USSR Academy of Sciences
Head of Propaganda Department of CPSU CC
Institute of Red Professors alumni
Recipients of the Order of Friendship of Peoples
Recipients of the Order of Lenin
Recipients of the Order of the Red Banner of Labour
Recipients of the Order of the Red Star
Academic journal editors
Communist writers
Russian philosophers
Soviet philosophers

Burials in Troyekurovskoye Cemetery